This is a list of properties and districts in Screven County, Georgia that are listed on the National Register of Historic Places (NRHP).

Current listings

|}

References

Screven
Buildings and structures in Screven County, Georgia